Holowaty (may be spelled as Holovaty, Holovatyi) is a Ukrainian surname. Notable people with the surname include:

Adrian Holovaty, American web developer.
Bill Holowaty, American baseball coach.
Daniel Holowaty (born 1989), American soccer player.
Paul Holowaty (born 1985), English actor
Serhiy Holovatyi, Ukrainian politician.

See also
 
 
Holovatsky

Ukrainian-language surnames